Bas Saruq (also Romanized as Bās Sārūq; also known as Bas Sārū, Bāsh Sārūq, and Sārūj) is a village in Sarjam Rural District, Ahmadabad District, Mashhad County, Razavi Khorasan Province, Iran. At the 2006 census, its population was 168, in 45 families.

References 

Populated places in Mashhad County